"Volpone" is a 1968 Australian TV play based on the comedy play Volpone by the English playwright Ben Jonson. It was screened as part of Wednesday Theatre on the ABC.

Cast
 Peter O'Shaughnesy as Volpone
 Max Meldrum as Mosca
 Edward Ogden as Voltore
 Peter Collingwood as Corvino
 Tom Farley as Corbaccio
 Pat Bishop as Celia
 Frank Lloyd
 Peter McPhie as Bonario

Production
It was filmed in Sydney.

References

1968 television plays
1960s Australian television plays
1968 Australian television episodes
Wednesday Theatre (season 4) episodes
Works based on Volpone